Nikorima Te Miha (born 1 January 1980) in Cook Islands is a footballer who plays as a forward. He currently plays for Puaikura in the Cook Islands League and the Cook Islands national football team.

References

1980 births
Living people
Cook Islands international footballers
Association football forwards
Cook Island footballers
Puaikura FC players
1998 OFC Nations Cup players
2000 OFC Nations Cup players